Steef Nieuwendaal (born 29 January 1986) is a Dutch footballer who currently plays for OJC Rosmalen in the Dutch 	Derde Divisie.

Career
Nieuwendaal is a midfielder who was born in Weert and made his debut in professional football, being part of the Willem II Tilburg squad in the 2004–05 season. He also played for MVV Maastricht, FC Den Bosch and Sparta Rotterdam.

References

External links
 Voetbal International profile 
 

1986 births
Living people
Dutch footballers
Eredivisie players
Eerste Divisie players
Willem II (football club) players
MVV Maastricht players
FC Den Bosch players
Sparta Rotterdam players
RKC Waalwijk players
Sportspeople from Weert
Association football midfielders
Footballers from Limburg (Netherlands)